Presidents of the Second Chamber of the Estates of Württemberg

Sources
Raberg, Frank (editor): Biographisches Handbuch der württembergischen Landtagsabgeordneten 1815-1933, Kohlhammer Verlag, Stuttgart 2001 

Political history of Germany
Württemberg